
Gmina Szydłowo is a rural gmina (administrative district) in Piła County, Greater Poland Voivodeship, in west-central Poland.

Villages
Gmina Szydłowo contains the villages and settlements of Coch PGR, Cyk, Czaplino, Dąbrowa-Kolonia, Dobrzyca, Dolaszewo, Furman, Gądek, Jaraczewo, Klęśnik, Kłoda, Kolonia Busz, Kotuń, Krępsko, Leśny Dworek, Leżenica, Leżenica-Kolonia, Nowa Łubianka, Nowy Dwór, Pluty, Płytnica, Pokrzywnica, Róża Mała, Róża Wielka, Róża Wielka-Kolonia, Różanka, Skrzatusz, Stara Łubianka, Szydłowo, Tarnowo, Wildek, Zabrodzie and Zawada.

Neighbouring gminas
Gmina Szydłowo is bordered by the town of Piła and by the gminas of Jastrowie, Krajenka, Tarnówka, Trzcianka and Wałcz.

References
Polish official population figures 2006

Szydlowo
Piła County